The North Star is the debut album by Scottish singer-songwriter Roddy Frame, released in September 1998 by Independiente. It features the single "Reason for Living", which peaked at number 45 on the UK Singles Chart.

Track listing

Personnel 

 Roddy Frame – vocals, guitar, bass, mandolin
 Andy Claine – backing vocals
 Yolanda Charles – bass
 Claire Kenny – bass
 Jeremy Stacey – drums
 Mark Edwards – keyboards, piano, organ
 Luis Jardim – percussion
 Barriemore Barlow – percussion

Technical

 Simon Dawson – engineer, record producer
 Matt Lawrence – assistant engineer
 Gerard Navarro – assistant engineer
 Jon Kelly – mixer
 Andy Green – assistant mixer
 Ellen Nolan – photography

Chart performance 
The North Star spent a total of two weeks in the UK Albums Chart, peaking at number 55 on 3 October 1998.

References 

Independiente Records albums
1998 debut albums
Roddy Frame albums